is a Prefectural Natural Park in Iwate Prefecture, Japan. Established in 1961, the park spans the municipalities of Morioka and Iwaizumi.

See also
 National Parks of Japan

References

External links
  Map of Sotoyama-Hayasaka Prefectural Natural Park (Sotoyama area)
  Map of Sotoyama-Hayasaka Prefectural Natural Park (Hayasaka area)

Parks and gardens in Iwate Prefecture
Protected areas established in 1961
1961 establishments in Japan
Morioka, Iwate
Iwaizumi, Iwate